Robert Douglas Fitchner (born December 22, 1950) is a retired professional ice hockey player who played 414 games in the World Hockey Association (WHA), with the Edmonton Oilers, Indianapolis Racers and Quebec Nordiques between 1973 and 1979. When the WHA merged with the National Hockey League (NHL) for the 1979–80 NHL season, Fitchner played 78 NHL games with the Nordiques between 1979 and 1981.

Career statistics

Regular season and playoffs

References
 

1950 births
Living people
Amarillo Wranglers players
Brandon Wheat Kings players
Canadian ice hockey centres
Edmonton Oilers (WHA) players
Fort Wayne Komets players
Hershey Bears players
Indianapolis Racers players
Ice hockey people from Ontario
Pittsburgh Penguins draft picks
Quebec Nordiques players
Quebec Nordiques (WHA) players
Rochester Americans players
Sportspeople from Greater Sudbury
Winston-Salem Polar Twins (SHL) players